Sheila Stuart (Gladys May Baker, 1892–1974) was a Scottish writer. She was best known for her children's books, especially among schoolgirls.

Early life
Stuart's father was a Church of Scotland minister: she was born and brought up in a manse in Johnstone, Renfrewshire. She went to school in Glasgow, then entered Leng and Co of Dundee (later incorporated into D. C. Thomson & Co. Ltd), where she trained as a journalist. During the First World War she served as a VAD.

Stuart began her career as a journalist, writing for Scottish Field and The People's Friend, although she also wrote books on antiques during this period.

Children's writer
Stuart is best known for her children's books about Alison and her brother Niall, based in the north-west of Scotland. The publication of every new book in the series caused great excitement "among schoolgirl borrowers", because of their tales of "courage, determination and adventure".

Death
Sheila Stuart died in 1974 in Crieff, Perthshire, where she had moved on her husband's retirement.

Works
Alison's Highland Holiday (1946) 
More Adventures of Alison (1947)
Alison's Christmas Adventure (1948)
Well Done Alison! (1949)
Alison's Easter Adventure (1950)
Alison's Poaching Adventure (1951)
Alison's Kidnapping Adventure (1952)
Alison's Pony Adventure (1953)
Alison's Island Adventure (1954)
Alison's Spy Adventure (1955)
Alison and the Witch's Cave (1956)
Alison's Yacht Adventure (1957)
Alison's Riding Adventure (1958)
Alison's Cliff Adventure (1959)
Alison's Caravan Adventure (1960)
The Riddle of Corran Lodge (1959)

References

Sources
Philip, A. The Librarian and the Bookworld, J. Clarke, pp. 43–44, 1954–1955

1892 births
1974 deaths
Scottish children's writers
Scottish women novelists
20th-century Scottish novelists
20th-century British women writers
People from Renfrewshire
20th-century Scottish women